Jean-François-Ernest Jaime (28 April 1804 – 7 June 1884) was a French watercolourist, lithographer, art historian and playwright. He was the father of dramatist Adolphe Jaime (1824–1901).

He collaborated to Le Figaro and La Caricature.

His plays were presented on the most significant Parisian stages of the 19th century: Variétés, Gaîté, Palais-Royal, etc. He also authored some songs.

Works

Theatre 

1832: La Sylphide, drama in 2 acts mixed with song, with Jules Seveste
1832: Le Chevreuil, comédie en vaudevilles in 3 acts, with Léon Halévy
1832: Folbert, ou le Mari de la cantatrice, comedy in 1 act mixed with song, with Halévy
1832: Une course en fiacre, comédie en vaudevilles in 2 acts
1832: Le Grand Seigneur et la Paysanne, ou Une leçon d'égalité, comedy in 2 acts mixed with song, with Halévy and de Leuven
1832: Grillo, ou le Prince et le banquier, comédie en vaudevilles in 2 acts, with Halévy
1832: La Métempsycose, bêtise in 1 act mixed with song, with de Courcy
1833: L'Assassin, folie-vaudeville in 1 act, with Lauzanne
1833: Le Baptême du petit Gibou, ou Madame Pochet marraine, pièce grivoise in 2 acts mixed with song, with Dumersan
1833: L'Élève de la nature, ou Jeanne et Jenny, fice-act play in 2 parts mixed with song, with Jules Seveste
1833: M. Mouflet, ou le Duel au 3e étage, comédie en vaudevilles in 1 act, with L. Halévy
1833: Les Fileuses, comédie en vaudevilles in 1 act
1834: L'Aiguillette bleue, historical vaudeville in 3 acts, with d'Artois and Masson
1834: Le Mentor faubourien, tableau-vaudeville in 1 act
1834: L'Autorité dans l'embarras, comédie en vaudevilles in 1 act, with Decomberousse
1835: Le Père Goriot, drama-vaudeville in 3 acts, with Decomberousse et Théaulon
1835: La Tirelire, tableau-vaudeville in 1 act, with the Cogniard brothers
1836: Carmagnole, ou Les Français sont des farceurs, épisode of the Italian wars in 1 act, with Pittaud de Forges and Théaulon
1836: Geneviève, ou la Grisette de province, drama in 4 acts mixed with songs, with Halévy
1837: Louise Duval, ou Un préjugé, drama in 4 acts mixed with songs, with L. Halévy
1837: Michel, ou Amour et Menuiserie, comédie en vaudevilles in 4 acts, with Duvert and Lauzanne
1838: Le Marquis de Brunoy, play in 5 acts, with Théaulon
1838: À bas les hommes !, vaudeville in 2 acts, with Deslandes and the Cogniard brothers
1838: Le Cabaret de Lustucru, comédie en vaudevilles in 1 act, with Arago and Dumanoir
1838: Rigoletti, ou le Dernier des fous, vaudeville in 1 act, with Alboize de Pujol
1841: Pour mon fils, comédie en vaudevilles in 2 acts, with Bayard
1841: Les Trois Étoiles, comedy in 1 act mixed with songs, with Halévy
1842: Les Informations conjugales, vaudeville in 1 act, with Duvert and Lauzanne
1842: Jaket's Club, vaudeville in 2 acts, with de Villeneuve
1843: L'Art de tirer des carottes, vaudeville in 1 act, with Marc-Michel
1843: Une campagne à deux, comedy in 1 act, with Charles Dupeuty
1844: Le Carlin de la marquise, vaudeville in 2 acts, with Clairville
1844: Un ange tutélaire, comédie en vaudevilles in 1 act, with Lockroy and Marc-Michel
1845: Le Diable à quatre, vaudeville-féerie in 3 acts, with Delaporte
1845: La Morale en action, comédie en vaudevilles in 1 act, with de Villeneuve
1845: Le Loup-garou, vaudeville in 2 acts, with Varin
1847: Les Étouffeurs de Londres, ou La taverne des Sept-cadrans, drama in 5 acts, with Foucher
1848: L'Illustration, vaudeville with magic lantern colored glasses, with Brunswick
1848: Le Réveil du lion, comédie en vaudevilles in 2 acts, with Bayard
1850: Célestin père et fils, ou Jadis et Aujourd'hui, opening prologue in 3 tableaux, with Lefebvre
1850: Montansier père et fils, vaudeville in 2 tableaux, with H. Lefebvre
1853: Le Célèbre Vergeot, vaudeville in 1 act, with Varin
1854: La Corde sensible, vaudeville in 1 act, with Clairville and Lambert-Thiboust
1856: Six demoiselles à marier, operetta in 1 act, with Choler, music by Delibes
1872: Le Jour de la paye, verse comedy in 1 act

History 
1852: À Sa Majesté l'Empereur Napoléon III, 2 vol.
1866: À soixante ans
1868: Un peu de tout (heures perdues)
1871: Les Prussiens à Versailles et dans le département de Seine-et-Oise
1871: Souvenirs de 1848 à 1871

Songs 
1850-1851: Chansons populaires, dédiées aux ouvriers amis de l'ordre
1866: Le Nouveau Genre français
1871: La Revue du 29 juin 1871 : l'Emprunt, la Revanche; épître à M. Thiers

Lithographies and watercolours 
1838: Musée de la caricature, ou recueil des caricatures les plus remarquables publiées en France depuis le XIVe siècle jusqu’à nos jours, 2 vols. Delloye
1839: Paris au XIXe siècle. Recueil de scènes de la vie parisienne dessinées d'après nature, collective work, with Roger de Beauvoir, Edmond Burat de Gurgy, Albéric Second, Achille Devéria, Adolphe Adam, Paul Gavarni, Honoré Daumier etc.
1842: Bichette, reine des amours
1842: La Cocotte
1857: Douze vues des châteaux et parcs de Versailles, dessinées d'après nature
1859: Saint-Germain, le château, la ville et la forêt dessinés d'après nature
1859: Le Palais impérial de Saint-Cloud, le parc et la ville, dessinés d'après nature
1860: Aux typographes versaillais
1867: Palais et jardins de Versailles et de Trianon, vingt-six vues dessinées d'après nature
 Dieppe, ses environs et ses habitans, ou choix de vues, monumens et costumes
 Environs de Berne, peintre à son chevalet devant un moulin à eau, aquarelle

Bibliography 
 Pierre Larousse, Grand dictionnaire universel du XIXe siècle, supplément, vol.16, 1877,  
 Émile Bellier de La Chavignerie, Dictionnaire général des artistes de l'école française, 1882
 Gérald Schurr, Les Petits maîtres de la peinture, 1979,

External links 
 Lithographies by Ernest Jaime

19th-century French dramatists and playwrights
19th-century French historians
French watercolourists
French lithographers
Artists from Paris
1804 births
1884 deaths